Crown of Creation is the fourth studio album by the San Francisco psychedelic rock band Jefferson Airplane, and was released by RCA Victor in August 1968. Containing more rock music than previous efforts, the album saw the band continuing their development of psychedelic music, emphasizing acid rock with science fiction themes.

While failing to eclipse Surrealistic Pillow (1967) from a commercial standpoint, the album was a considerable success in comparison to its immediate predecessor, peaking at No. 6 on the Billboard Pop Charts and earning a RIAA gold certification. Its two singles ("Greasy Heart", released in April 1968, followed by the title track in November) were modest hits on the Hot 100 chart. It was voted number 591 in Colin Larkin's All Time Top 1000 Albums 3rd Edition (2000).

Background 

Prior to recording, the group had their manager and promoter Bill Thompson purchase a large 20-room, three-story, home at 2400 Fulton Street directly across from Golden Gate Park in San Francisco where the members would live communally. Costing $73,000, the home, known as "The Airplane House" or simply "The Mansion" included a refurbished basement with a built-in recording studio. The band became a tight grouping and much of their composing began at their new headquarters. The combination of individuals continued the experimentation and visionary lyrical compositions that made them quintessential in the San Francisco psychedelic rock scene. Writing was generally equal among the group members as they all took part in one or more tracks.

Recording 

Recording took place in early 1968 well into the summer in RCA studios in which the band included distorted sound effects and guitar sections, and tracks enriched in overdubbing. Stylistically it was their most diverse album to date, taking everything the band had attempted previously and developing to that point. The Airplane included heavy-rock jams similar to their live act, and folk-rock compositions, a nod to their work on Surrealistic Pillow. Overall it was much more tightly structured than their previous effort. Track arrangements stand as complex and sophisticated further explaining why the band had no hit-ready singles. Several guest musicians were involved in the development of the album including David Crosby, Bill Goodwin, and Tim Davis. Jefferson Airplane was on a condensed schedule when considering their concerts and TV appearances. Sessions were completed in between their commitments, so recording was prolonged since they only had brief periods in which to work.

Release 
Crown of Creation was released in August 1968 in the United States in stereo as RCA LSP-4058 and in mono as RCA LPM-4058. It would be the last Jefferson Airplane album to be released in mono and their second and final album to reach the Top Ten, peaking at No. 6. The group continued to struggle on the singles charts. Slick's composition and opening single, "Greasy Heart", stalled at No. 98 on the Billboard Hot 100 after its release in April 1968. The single fell off the charts in three weeks. The album cover artwork featured the band members' images duplicated in slightly different positions. In the background, there is a mushroom cloud from an atomic explosion courtesy of the USAF. Designing was produced by John Van Hamersveld in Los Angeles. Vinyl release included a "Brumus sheet", which offered song lyrics, and credits with an image of Robert Kennedy's dog. The title track and second single, "Crown of Creation", fared better on the singles chart, but still only reached No. 64.

Thanks to the then-new FM radio, the band received airplay for lengthier tracks and whole albums which kept them relevant, especially in the counterculture of the US.

Cash Box said of "Greasy Heart" that it has "potent throbbing rhythm, some outstanding guitar breaks and the sharp vocal delivery."

Crown of Creation was released on compact disc on August 11, 2003. Four bonus tracks are included such as the Frank Zappa, Grace Slick cowritten track "Would You Like A Snack?". Other tracks include the mono single mix of "Share A Little Joke", the previously unreleased eight-minute song, "The Saga of Sydney Spacepig" and "Ribump Ba Bup Bup", which is a combination of noises, sound effects, and pop culture catch phrases. Along with the four bonus tracks is a hidden track called "Candy Man".

Track listing 

 Written in part for drummer Spencer Dryden's 30th birthday, and in part for bassist Jack Casady's arrest for nudity at Santa Cruz.

Personnel 
Jefferson Airplane
Marty Balin – vocals, rhythm guitar
Grace Slick – vocals, piano, organ
Paul Kantner – rhythm guitar, vocals
Jorma Kaukonen – lead guitar, electric chicken, vocals
Jack Casady – Yggdrasil bass
Spencer Dryden – drums, piano, organ, steel balls, vocals

Additional musicians 
Arthur Tripp – percussion
Gary Blackman – nose solo (heard on track 1)
Charles Cockey – guitar, vocals
David Crosby – guitar
Tim Davis – congas
Bill Goodwin – talking drums
Danny Woody – bongos
Gene Twombly – sound effects

Production 
Al Schmitt – producer
Richie Schmitt – engineer
Pat Ieraci – 8-Track
Hiro – cover and back photography
USAF – bomb photo, sometimes attributed to the Hiroshima detonation, but is in fact one of the US desert testing explosions.
J. Van Hamersveld – album design, art direction
Bill Laudner – road manager
Chick Casady – equipment manager
Bill Thompson – manager

Charts 
Album

Single

References 

Notes

Jefferson Airplane albums
1968 albums
RCA Victor albums
Albums produced by Al Schmitt
Albums with cover art by John Van Hamersveld
Acid rock albums